Lee Cross Rinker (born November 10, 1960) is an American professional golfer.

Rinker was born in Stuart, Florida. He played college golf at the University of Alabama and turned professional in 1983

Rinker joined the PGA Tour in 1983, but struggled to keep his card. His best year came in 1997, when he finished second twice, and made nearly $500,000. However, his struggles continued, and he has not made a cut on the PGA Tour since 1999. He has played on the Nationwide Tour for many years. In November 2010, he earned his 2011 Champions Tour card by finishing second at qualifying school.

Rinker's brother, Larry, and his sister, Laurie, are also professional golfers. Sister-in-law Kelli, wife of older brother Laine, was also on the LPGA Tour.

Rinker is currently the Director of Golf at the Emerald Dunes Club in West Palm Beach, Florida.

Tournament wins
this list may be incomplete
2003 South Florida PGA Championship
2006 South Florida PGA Championship
2008 EZ-Go South Florida PGA Open

Results in major championships

Note: Rinker never played in the Masters Tournament nor The Open Championship.

CUT = missed the half-way cut
"T" = tied

U.S. national team appearances
PGA Cup: 1992 (winners), 2007 (winners), 2009 (winners)

See also
1983 PGA Tour Qualifying School graduates
1994 PGA Tour Qualifying School graduates

External links

Lee Rinker wins South Florida PGA Open

American male golfers
Alabama Crimson Tide men's golfers
PGA Tour golfers
PGA Tour Champions golfers
Golfers from Florida
People from Stuart, Florida
People from Jupiter, Florida
1960 births
Living people